Reevesland (Reeves Farmhouse or Torreyson Farm) is the remnant of an estate that was once located in the present Boulevard Manor neighborhood of Arlington County, Virginia.

History

Reevesland has the distinction of being the last operating dairy farm in Arlington. The 160-acre farm remained in the same family for three generations and it represents an important era in Arlington’s history, when the area was transformed from a sleepy, rural community into the thriving suburban/urban county it is today. Reevesland was the name given to the farm and dairy operation by George Reeves.

Originally known as the Torreyson Farm, the land was purchased in 1863 by William H. Torreyson, who built a house around 1865 and used it as a tenant house. In 1898, it became the home of Torreyson’s daughter, Lucy and her husband, George Reeves. The last owner of the original property and farmhouse was Nelson Reeves, son of George Reeves. He was born in the existing farmhouse in 1900 and spent his life there, working as a third-generation farmer. In 1932, Reevesland began using milking machines — a sign of modernization. Nelson and his father continued to operate the farm during the Depression and World War II. The family continued to raise dairy cattle and crops until 1955, about the time that tank trucks replaced milk cans. After farming operations ceased, most of the land was subdivided and sold. Only two acres containing the farmhouse remain. 

The Arlington County government purchased Reevesland in 2001 to enlarge the heavily-used Bluemont Park and provide additional recreational opportunities to County residents. The acquisition of the  property allowed the County to protect a popular sledding hill and to preserve the remaining portion of the County’s last dairy farm. The Arlington County Board designated the building to be a local historic district on December 11, 2004.

Future plans
In August 2015, a coalition of neighborhood and historic preservation groups, including the Arlington Historical Society, the Boulevard Manor Civic Association, and  Preservation Arlington, proposed to establish a new nonprofit group with the goal of acquiring and maintaining the historic Reeves farmhouse.

See also
 List of Arlington County Historic Districts

References

External links
Arlington Historical Society
Boulevard Manor Civic Association (See Slide show of photographs of Reeves Farmhouse and Reevesland historic plaque. See COUNTY POSTS FAQS ON REEVESLAND, June 15, 2015)
Preservation Arlington
"Activists fight to keep historic Arlington farmhouse", WUSA9, June 3, 2015

Buildings and structures in Arlington, Virginia
Arlington County Historic Districts
Buildings and structures completed in 1865
1865 establishments in Virginia